The Canada men's national tennis team represents Canada in Davis Cup tennis competition since 1913. They are overseen by Tennis Canada, the governing body of tennis in Canada.

The team won their first Davis Cup in 2022, beating Australia 2–0 in the final. In its first appearance in 1913 it had reached the World Group final, losing to the United States 0–3.

History

1913–2010: Moderate success
Canada competed in its first Davis Cup in 1913. The team won its first tie, played in June at the Queen's Club, London over South Africa by a score of 4–1. The team consisted of just two players, Robert Powell and Bernard Schwengers. Canada then in July easily defeated Belgium in the semi-finals 4–0. In the playoff final however, played a week later, they lost all three matches to the Americans in straight sets. (The Americans went on to defeat Great Britain in the challenge round, to win the competition.)

Canada did not play a World Group tie from 1921 until 1991, when the team of Grant Connell, Glenn Michibata, Andrew Sznajder, and Martin Wostenholme, with team captain Pierre Lamarche, lost 1–4 away to Spain. The following year, again in the World Group first round, Canada came closer to advancing, going down 2–3 at home to Sweden despite taking a first-day 2–0 lead. The tie was highlighted by a surprise singles win of rookie Daniel Nestor over superstar and then world number one ranked Stefan Edberg. Nestor could not repeat the magic, however, losing in the deciding rubber match in 5 sets to Magnus Gustafsson.

In 2004, Canada fell to the Netherlands 1–4 in the World Group first round. Team members then were Simon Larose, Frank Dancevic, Frédéric Niemeyer, and Daniel Nestor as a star doubles specialist.

2011–12: Back in the World Group
In 2011, Canada defeated the Israel Davis Cup team 3–2 at the Canada Stadium in Ramat Hasharon, Israel to qualify for the 2012 Davis Cup World Group. Canada's team consisted of Milos Raonic, Vasek Pospisil, Daniel Nestor, Philip Bester and Peter Polansky. The teams split the first two matches in two upsets, as Pospisil defeated Dudi Sela and Amir Weintraub beat Raonic. Nestor and Pospisil defeated Jonathan Erlich and Andy Ram in the doubles match. On the final day, Sela defeated Polansky in the fourth match while Pospisil defeated Weintraub in the final match.
   
In 2012, Canada played against France in the first round of the World Group, but lost 1–4. Pospisil lost the first match to Jo-Wilfried Tsonga and Raonic won the next one against Julien Benneteau to end day one at 1–1. Canada then lost the three next matches (the doubles and the last singles match) as Raonic had to withdraw for his second singles match against Tsonga following an injury on his left knee. He was replaced by Dancevic who lost in straight sets. Canada secured its spot in the World Group in 2013, and for the second straight year, with a 4–1 victory over South Africa in the playoffs in September. Canada had only played two straight years in the World Group one other time in its history before that, in 1991–92.

2013: Run to the World Group semifinals
In 2013, Canada upset the number one ranked tennis nation Spain 3–2 in the first round of the World Group, the first win ever for Canada at that stage in the Open Era. Raonic won the first match over Albert Ramos and Dancevic defeated then No. 34 Marcel Granollers to give Canada a 2–0 lead after the first day. Canada's doubles team of Nestor and Pospisil lost to Marc López and Granollers, but Raonic secured the win for Canada in the final day with a victory over Guillermo García-López. Dancevic lost the last match to Ramos. Canada then defeated in April Italy 3–1 in the quarterfinals to reach the second semifinal of its history, the first in the Open Era. Italy's Andreas Seppi won the first match over Pospisil, but Raonic answered back with a victory over Fabio Fognini. The Canadian doubles team of Nestor and Pospisil took the crucial doubles match in a marathon of almost four hours and a half over Daniele Bracciali and Fognini. Raonic gave Canada the win after defeating Seppi in the final day. Canada was eliminated 2–3 by Serbia in the semifinals in September. World No. 1 Novak Djokovic won the first match over Pospisil and Raonic took the second over Janko Tipsarević to end day one at 1–1. Canada had a 2–1 lead after the second day when the doubles team of Nestor and Pospisil defeated Nenad Zimonjić and Ilija Bozoljac. Raonic and Pospisil both lost their matches the final day, respectively to Djokovic and to Tipsarević. Canada will stay in the World Group in 2014 for a third straight year, a record.

2014–2018: Continuing presence in the World Group 
In 2014, a very diminished Canadian team lost in the World Group first round to Japan 1–4 as both Raonic and Pospisil were injured and not able to play. Canada then had to play a playoff in September against Colombia to stay in the World Group next year. They won the tie 3–2 meaning that Canada will play in the World Group for the fourth straight year.

In 2015, Canada had their revenge over Japan with a 3–2 win in the first round of the World Group. Raonic defeated Tatsuma Ito in straight sets in the first match and Kei Nishikori won against Pospisil to end the first day in a 1–1 tie. The next day, Canada's doubles team of Nestor and Pospisil won a closely contested match over Go Soeda and Yasutaka Uchiyama to give a 2–1 lead to Canada. Nishikori defeated Raonic in five sets the last day but Pospisil secured the victory for Canada with a straight-set win over Soeda. Canada next played its quarterfinal tie in July but, without its two best singles players Raonic and Pospisil who were both injured, fell 0–5 to Belgium on the road.

In 2016, Canada played its World Group first round against France. Again, without its best player Raonic who was out because of an adductor injury and Nestor not able to play for personal reasons, Canada was defeated by a score of 0–5. They next played a playoff tie in September against Chile, winning by the score of 5–0 and securing Canada's place in the World Group for the sixth straight year.

In 2017, Canada, once again without Raonic, lost for the second straight year in the first round of the World Group to Great Britain. Pospisil won his two singles matches over top 50 players Kyle Edmund and Dan Evans, but lost in doubles with Nestor against Dominic Inglot and Jamie Murray. 17-year-old Denis Shapovalov played the two other singles matches, losing the opener to Evans and the deciding rubber to Edmund. In the latter, he hit the match umpire, Arnaud Gabas, in the eye after launching a ball aimlessly towards the crowd in anger after dropping serve in the opening stages of the third set, defaulting the match and tie as a consequence. Canada then won in September a playoff tie over India by the score of 3–2, with wins by Shapovalov in singles and by Nestor and Pospisil in doubles, and will stay in the World Group for a seventh straight year.

In 2018, the first season with new captain Frank Dancevic, Canada lost once again in the first round of the World Group by the score of 1–3 to Croatia. Borna Ćorić won the first rubber over Pospisil, and Shapovalov won the second over Viktor Galović. Despite leading 6–2, 6–3, 4–2, Nestor and Pospisil lost the crucial doubles match against Marin Čilić and Ivan Dodig in five sets. The final day, Shapovalov lost to Ćorić, meaning that Canada had to play a playoff tie in September versus Netherlands to secure its place in the World Group for 2019, which they won by a score of 3–1, through two singles wins by Raonic and one singles win by Shapovalov.

2019: First Canadian final
In February 2019, following a format change in the Davis Cup, Canada played in the 2019 Davis Cup Qualifying Round versus Slovakia in order to qualify for the 2019 Davis Cup Finals later in the year. Shapovalov won his first singles match, but then Canada lost the next two matches before rallying with two straight singles match victories by Shapovalov and newcomer Félix Auger-Aliassime to win by a score of 3–2.

The Canadian team fielded only two players in the 2019 Davis Cup Finals to make it to the final tie: Vasek Pospisil and Denis Shapovalov. In the group stage, Canada beat Italy by 2–1, winning both its singles matches against higher-ranked players. Pospisil beat Fabio Fognini in straight sets, and Shapovalov beat Matteo Berrettini in a nail-biter featuring three tie-breaks. The Italians won the doubles match. In their tie against the US, Pospisil beat Reilly Opelka in two tie-breaks, and Shapovalov beat Taylor Fritz, with a tie-break in the first set. The doubles match was not played.

In the knock-out stage, the Canadians played Australia in the quarterfinals. Pospisil again led off by beating John Millman in the first match, but Shapovalov lost in three sets to Alex de Minaur. They recovered, however, to win the doubles match in straight sets. They next faced Russia in the semifinals. Pospisil lost his first match to Andrey Rublev, who was undefeated. But Shapovalov beat Karen Khachanov, and the pair sealed a trip to the final in the doubles match. They faced Spain in the final tie.

Current team
Rankings as of November 21, 2022

Players

*Active players in bold, statistics as of February 5, 2018

Recent performances
Here is the list of all match-ups since 1981, when the competition started being held in the current World Group format.

1980s

1990s

2000s

2010s

Head-to-head record

*Previous champions in bold. Teams that have been ranked No. 1 in italics. Statistics as of November 21, 2019

See also

List of Canada Davis Cup team representatives
Davis Cup
Tennis Canada
Canada Fed Cup team
Canada at the Hopman Cup

References

External links

Tennis Canada

Davis Cup teams
Davis Cup